Sara Errani and Roberta Vinci were the defending champions, but withdrew from the semifinals against Tímea Babos and Kristina Mladenovic.
Anna-Lena Grönefeld and Květa Peschke won the title, defeating Babos and Mladenovic in the final, 6–7(7–9), 6–4, [10–5].

Seeds

Draw

Draw

References 
 Main Draw

Open GDF Suez - Doubles
Doubles 2014